Marcos Fernando Nangi (born 16 March 1969), also known as Marcão is a former Brazilian football player.

Playing career
In November 1993, Marcão joined Japanese J1 League club Shimizu S-Pulse when there are a few remaining games in 1993 season. On December 1, he debuted in J1 against Verdy Kawasaki. He played 2 matches in 1993 season and left the club end of 1993 season.

Club statistics

Honours 

 Varzim

 Liga2 Portugal top goalscorer (2): 1998–1999, 1999-2000

References

External links

1969 births
Living people
Brazilian footballers
Brazilian expatriate footballers
J1 League players
Shimizu S-Pulse players
Expatriate footballers in Japan
Association football forwards
Serie B players
Liga Portugal 2 players
Associação Atlética Ponte Preta players
Goiânia Esporte Clube players
Centro Sportivo Alagoano players
Goiás Esporte Clube players
Esporte Clube XV de Novembro (Piracicaba) players
Grêmio Foot-Ball Porto Alegrense players
F.C. Penafiel players
Gil Vicente F.C. players
Varzim S.C. players
C.F. Os Belenenses players